Morgan Weisser (born May 12, 1971) is an American former actor. He is best known for his role in the television series Space: Above and Beyond (1995–1996).

Filmography

Film

Television

Awards and nominations

References

External links
 
 

1971 births
Living people
American male film actors
American male television actors
American people of German descent
Male actors from Los Angeles
People from Venice, Los Angeles
20th-century American male actors
21st-century American male actors